Sreelatha Namboothiri (born Anjilivelil Vasantha) is an Indian actress and playback singer who works in Malayalam cinema and television. She has acted in more than 300 films. Khadeeja in 1967 was her debut movie.

Early life

Sreelatha was born as Vasantha, in Karuvatta, Alappuzha. Her father Anjilivelil Balakrishnan Nair was an army officer and her mother, Kamalamma was a music teacher in Government school. Her primary education was at Govt. Girls High School, Haripad, Alappuzha. She was an athlete while at school. She won second prize for long jump twice at state level. She joined K.P.A.C. (Kerala People's Arts Club), when she was studying in seventh grade, as a singer and later started performing drama in many stages. She could not continue her studies  after that. She learned classical music from Dakshinamurthy.

Personal life

She was married to Kaladi Parameshwaran Namboothiri, known as Kaladi Namboothiri, an actor and Ayurveda doctor in 1979. They both acted together in Papathinu Maranamilla, a 1979 movie. She took a break from movies after marriage and settled in Kunnamkulam, Thrissur. The couple has a son, Visakh, and a daughter, Ganga. She made a comeback, after her husband's death in 2005, with Pathaka. She currently resides at Thiruvananthapuram, Kerala.

Filmography

References

External links
 
Sreelatha Namboothiri at MSI

Actresses in Malayalam cinema
Indian film actresses
Actresses from Kerala
Living people
Actresses in Tamil cinema
People from Alappuzha district
Indian television actresses
Actresses in Malayalam television
20th-century Indian actresses
21st-century Indian actresses
Actresses from Thrissur
Year of birth missing (living people)